Stavros (Σταύρος ) is a Greek name. It comes from σταυρóς, the Christian cross, but is distinguished from it by having the accent on the first syllable rather than the second. (cf. Christos, as given name and surname). The word root comes from the verb ἵστημι which means "I make something stand, I stop".

Unlike many other names of Greek origin (e.g. Alexander, Nicholas, Peter, Stephen) that have been adopted by many languages, Stavros is used as a given name most commonly by Greeks.
The female versions of the name are Stavroula (much more common) and Stavriani (rare).

Given name 
Stavros Arnaoutakis (born 1956), Greek and European politician
Stavros Diamantopoulos (born 1947), Greek footballer
Stavros Dimas (born 1941), Greek and European politician
Stavros Ditsios (born 1978), Greek visual artist
Stavros Foukaris (born 1975), Cypriot footballer
Stavros Georgiou (born 1972), Greek footballer
Stavros Giannopoulos (born 1961), Greek water polo player
Stavros Glouftsis (born 1981), Greek footballer
Stavros Halkias (born 1989), American comedian
Stavros Karampelas (born 1973), Greek politician 
Stavros Katsanevas (born 1953), Greek astroparticle physicist
Stavros Kazantzidis, Australian writer, director and producer
Stavros Kontonis (born 1963), Greek lawyer and politician
Stavros Konstantinou (born 1984), Cypriot singer
Stavros Kostopoulos (1900–1968), Greek banker and politician
Stavros Kouyioumtzis (1932–2005), Greek music composer
Stavros V. Kyriakides (born 1971), Cypriot businessman
Stavros Labrakis (born 1970), Greek footballer
Stavros Labriakos (born 1975), Greek footballer
Stavros Lambrinidis (born 1962), Greek and EU politician
Stavros G. Livanos (1891–1963), Greek shipping magnate
Stavros Malas (born 1967), Cypriot politician 
Stavros Michaelides (born 1970), Cypriot swimmer
Stavros Michalakakos (born 1987), Cypriot singer 
Stavros Niarchos (1909–1996), Greek shipping magnate
Stavros Papastavrou (born 1967), Greek politician
Stavros Paravas (1935–2008), Greek actor
Stavros Paskaris (born 1984), American ice hockey player
Stavros Petavrakis (born 1992, Greek footballer
Stavros Rigas (died 1921), nom de guerre "Kapetan Kavodoros", officer of the Hellenic Army 
Stavros Sarafis (born 1950), Greek football player
Stavros Schizas (born 1989), Greek basketball player
Stavros Stathakis (born 1987), Greek footballer 
Stavros Theodorakis (born 1963), Greek journalist and politician
Stavros Thomadakis, Greek economist 
Stavros Toutziarakis (born 1987), Greek basketball player
Stavros Tsoukalas (born 1988), Greek footballer 
Stavros Tziortziopoulos (born 1978), Greek footballer 
Stavros Tziortzis (born 1948), Cypriot former athlete
Stavros Vasilantonopoulos (born 1992), Greek footballer
Stavros Vavouris (1925–2008), Greek poet
Stavros Xarchakos (born 1939), Greek composer
Stavros Xenidis (1924-2008), Greek actor
Stavros Zurukzoglu (1896–1966), Swiss eugenicist

Surname 
Gus Stavros, (born 1924/5) American entrepreneur, businessman, and philanthropist
Jasmin Stavros (Milo Vasić, born 1954), Croatian pop musician

Fictional characters
 Stavros, a comic character played by Harry Enfield
 General Stavros, in Command & Conquer: Red Alert

Locations 
Stavropol

Stavropol Krai

Stavronikita

See also
 Stavro
Stephen
 Stavros Flatley, a British-Cypriot father-son dance duo from Britain's Got Talent

Given names of Greek language origin
Greek masculine given names
Greek-language surnames
Surnames